The Stella Maris Monastery is a Catholic Christian monastery for Discalced Carmelite monks, located on the slopes of Mount Carmel in Haifa, Israel.

The main church inside the Stella Maris Monastery is said to contain the Cave of Elijah, a grotto associated with the Biblical prophet Elijah.

It is also known as the Monastery of Our Lady of Mount Carmel for monks, to distinguish it from the nearby Monastery of Our Lady of Mount Carmel for nuns, located higher up on Mount Carmel.

History

Crusader-period Carmelite beginnings 
In the 12th century, during the Kingdom of Jerusalem rule of the region, groups of religious hermits began to inhabit the caves of this area in imitation of Elijah the Prophet. In the early 13th century, their leader and prior (referred to in the rule only as 'Brother B', although sometimes claimed despite an absence of supporting evidence to be either Saint Brocard or Saint Bertold) asked the Latin Patriarch of Jerusalem, Albert Avogadro, to provide the group with a written rule of life, which he did.

This was the originating act of the Order, who took the name 'Order of the Brothers of Our Lady of Mount Carmel' or Carmelites. An oratory was dedicated to the Virgin Mary in her aspect of Our Lady, Star of the Sea, the latter part of which translates in Latin to Stella Maris. Within a few decades, when the capital of the Crusader Kingdom of Jerusalem, Saint Jean d'Acre, fell in 1291 to the Mamluks, these monastic hermits were forced to leave the Holy Land. The Carmelite order spread throughout Europe, where, from 1238 onwards, the Order had begun to found houses -- at the end of Saint Louis' first crusade to the Holy Land in 1254, he had taken six Carmelites back to France with him.

New locations (1631-1821)
In 1631 the Discalced branch of the Order returned to the Holy Land, led by the Venerable Father Prosper. He had a small monastery constructed on the promontory at Mount Carmel, close to the lighthouse, and the friars lived there until 1761, when Zahir al-Umar, the then effectively independent ruler of Galilee, ordered them to vacate the site and demolish the monastery.

The Order then moved to the present location, which is directly above the grotto where the prophet Elijah is said to have lived. Here they built a large church and monastery, first clearing the site of the ruins of a medieval Greek church, known as "the Abbey of St. Margaret" and a chapel, thought to date back to the time of the Byzantine Empire.

This new church was seriously damaged in Napoleon's 1799 campaign. Sick and wounded French soldiers were accommodated in the monastery, and when Napoleon withdrew, the Turks slaughtered them and drove out the friars.

In 1821, Abdullah Pasha of Acre ordered the ruined church to be totally destroyed, so that it could not serve as a fort for his enemies, while he attacked Jerusalem. The masonry was used to build a Abdullah Pasha's summer palace and a lighthouse, which were sold back to the Carmelite order in 1846.

Current building (1836)
The current church and monastery, built under the orders of Brother Cassini of the Order, was opened in 1836. Three years later Pope Gregory XVI bestowed the title of Minor Basilica on the sanctuary, and it is now known as "Stella Maris", meaning Star of the Sea. For much of the 20th century it was occupied by the military, first the British, and later the Israelis, but at the end of their lease it was handed back to the Order.

Description

Monastery
The monastery serves as a centre of Carmelite spirituality throughout the world. The symbol of the Order is mounted right above the entrance door. During the erection of the church, friars were assaulted by their neighbors and had to defend their property and the church guests. As a result, the monastery's ground floor is built out of thick walls with few and small openings covered by bars.

Main church
The monastery's main church resembles the shape of a cross. Its dome is decorated by colorful paintings based on motifs from both the Old and New Testament: Elijah rising to heaven, David stringing his harp, the prophet Isaiah, the Holy Family and the Four Evangelists. Latin inscriptions of biblical verses are written around the dome.

The altar stands on an elevated platform situated above a small cave associated with Elijah. The cave can be reached from the nave by descending a few steps and holds a stone altar with a small statue of Prophet Elijah. The altar above the cave is dominated by a statue of the Virgin Mary carrying Jesus in her lap and holding the Scapular in her right hand, known as Our Lady of the Scapular. The Blessed Virgin Mary is the patroness of the Carmelites, and as such is known as "Our Lady of Mount Carmel".

New embossments dedicated to Carmelite figures are hoisted on all four corners of the central hall. On the western wall of the church is a large organ that is played during religious ceremonies and at special church music concerts.

Annual procession
During the First World War, the statue of Our Lady of the Scapular, holding Baby Jesus and the scapular, was removed from the church and placed in a safer place in Haifa. After the war, in 1919, it was brought back to its place in a small procession. Since then, every first Sunday after Easter, on the same date as in 1919, what has become the second largest Catholic procession of the Holy Land after the Palm Sunday procession in Jerusalem, takes place between downtown Haifa and Stella Maris, up the western slope of the Carmel. Large crowds of Catholic Christians, including such of eastern rites, are led by the Latin Patriarch and other Church leaders in accompanying the statue on its way.

See also
Cave of Elijah
Monastery of Our Lady of Mount Carmel for nuns, also in Haifa, on Mount Carmel
Shmuel Oswald Rufeisen (1922–1998), Jewish convert to Christianity, Carmelite friar at Stella Maris, who was refused Israeli citizenship under the Law of Return

Gallery

References

Bibliography
 Irby and Mangles, 1823, p.193
Monastery of the Discalced Carmelites Stella Maris [in Polish], from Silvano Giordano (OCD), "Il carmelo in Terra Santa dalle origini ai giorni nostri" [Carmel in the Holy Land: From Its Beginnings to the Present Day], 1994, Sagep, Genova. Via the website of the Krakow Province of the Discalced Carmelites. Accessed 10 December 2020. A precise history of Christian and specifically Carmelite presence on Mount Carmel and of the monastery.

External links
https://www.carmelholylanddco.org/

Carmelite monasteries in Israel
Carmelite spirituality
History of Ottoman Syria
Our Lady of Mount Carmel
Basilica churches in Israel
19th-century Christian monasteries
Roman Catholic churches in Haifa
Church buildings in the Kingdom of Jerusalem
1836 establishments in Ottoman Syria
1631 establishments in Ottoman Syria
1820s disestablishments in Ottoman Syria
19th-century Roman Catholic church buildings in Israel
Mount Carmel